Universitetsholmen is an artificial island in Malmö harbor, Sweden surrounded by bays and channels, to the west of Malmö Central Station.

The island got its name in connection with the creation of Malmö University. The event center Malmö Live is situated on the southern part of Universitetsholmen.

The island is bounded by (clockwise from east) the inner harbor, Suellshamnen, Western Port Channel, Citadellshamnen and the Southern lap pool.

Geography of Malmö
Islands of Skåne County
Artificial islands of Sweden